Roger Cruickshank DFC (born 18 October 1982) is a Scottish pilot in the Royal Air Force, a Squadron Leader, and one of United Kingdom's top downhill skiers.

Early life
Roger Cruickshank was born on 18 October 1982 in Banchory, Aberdeenshire, Scotland.

Career
Cruickshank joined the Royal Air Force, where he serves as a Eurofighter Typhoon pilot. He served in Iraq in 2016. He was awarded the Distinguished Flying Cross in 2017.

In March 2005, Cruickshank crashed whilst skiing, which shattered his left tibia and required a metal plate with nine pins to be permanently fixed in his leg. After regaining the ability to walk in June 2005, he qualified for the 2006 Winter Olympics in Turin.  In the Men's Downhill event, skiing with a knee-brace, Cruickshank finished 37th.

Cruickshank is the co-author of Speed of Sound, Sound of Mind in 2016.

Personal life
Cruickshank lost his mother to depression after she committed suicide in 2010.

Honours 
 2017 : Distinguished Flying Cross.

Works

References

1982 births
Living people
People from Banchory
Royal Air Force officers
Scottish male alpine skiers
Alpine skiers at the 2006 Winter Olympics
Olympic alpine skiers of Great Britain
Recipients of the Distinguished Flying Cross (United Kingdom)
People of the War in Iraq (2013–2017)